The 11th Solitude Grand Prix was a non-Championship motor race, run for cars complying with Formula One rules, held on 23 July 1961 at the Solitudering, near Stuttgart. The race was run over 25 laps of the circuit, and was won by Innes Ireland in a Lotus 21.

Results

References

Solitude Grand Prix
Solituderennen
Solitude Grand Prix